Ghulam Faruq Yaqubi (1938 – 16 April 1992) was an Afghan politician and Army General. He was a significant figure In the Afghan Security Service, KHAD, from 1980 to 1985.

Early life and education
Born in Kabul, son of Khan Muhammad, and educated at the Najat School, Kabul police academy and in West Germany.

Career
He began his career as a lecturer at the Kabul police academy in 1966. Subsequently, he served as the director of operations and general director of the criminal department in Ministry of Interior Affairs. Yakubi was promoted both to Politburo status and the rank of Colonel General, the highest rank held by the regime's military. In 1986 the KHAD became a separate ministry under the name Ministry of State Security (WAD). The ministry was personally controlled by him, who started to take part in cabinet meetings in a ministerial capacity.

He was responsible for the defeat of a coup attempt on March 6, 1990. In that opportunity, Lieut. Gen. Shahnawaz Tanai and Gulbuddin Hekmatyar attempted to overthrow the Government, but their plans were discovered by the WAD under his command.

Death
After the collapse of President Najibullah's government in April 1992, he was either assassinated by the Afghan mujahideen or committed suicide. Although the new ruling council eventually declared a general amnesty, there were other instances of summary execution and reprisal killings by various forces after the coup. Some sources claimed that he killed himself after learning of the President's attempted escape.

References 

Afghan military personnel
Communist government ministers of Afghanistan
1992 deaths
1938 births
Afghan military officers